Christos Tsotras (born 13 May 2000) is a Greek professional footballer who plays as a forward for Super League 2 club Panachaiki.

References

2000 births
Living people
Greek footballers
Super League Greece 2 players
Gamma Ethniki players
Panachaiki F.C. players
Nafpaktiakos Asteras F.C. players
Association football forwards
Footballers from Pyrgos, Elis